Oshshaq (also Romanized as ‘Oshshāq and ‘Oshāq) is a village in Jowkar Rural District, Jowkar District, Malayer County, Hamadan Province, Iran. At the 2006 census, its population was 1,261, in 279 families.

References 

Populated places in Malayer County